Calle 7 Ecuador was an Ecuadoran television program, shown by TC Televisión from Monday to Friday at 6 pm.  It was last co-hosted by Ronald Farina and Jaime Arellano, and involved two teams of young adult contenders participating in unique challenges and performing arts to win a top prize at the end of the competition.

Seasons

Ecuadorian television shows
TC Televisión original programming